The Faculty of Medicine of the University of Oslo is the oldest and largest research and educational institution in medicine in Norway. It was founded in 1814, effectively as a Norwegian continuation of the Faculty of Medicine at the University of Copenhagen, the only university of Denmark-Norway until 1811. It was Norway's only medical faculty until the Cold War era. The faculty has around 1,000 employees, 2000 students and 1400 PhD candidates. The faculty is headquartered at Oslo University Hospital, Rikshospitalet, with important campuses at Oslo University Hospital, Ullevål and several other hospitals in the Oslo area.

The Faculty consists of three institutes and one center: Institute of Clinical Medicine, Institute of Basic Medical Science, Institute of Health and Society and Centre for Molecular Medicine Norway (NCMM).
The Dean is the Faculty's chief executive. From 2011 to 2018, Frode Vartdal has been the elected dean. In September 2018, Ivar Prydtz Gladhaug was elected new dean at the Faculty of medicine for 2019-2022. His team consists of four Deputy Deans: Pro-dean of research Jens Petter Berg, Pro-dean of studies Elin Rosvold, Vice-dean of internationalization Hilde Nebb and Vice dean of postdoctoral and master programmes Eivind Engebretsen.

Deans

References

External links
Official website

University of Oslo
Educational institutions established in 1814
1814 establishments in Norway